The Ali Olo is a mountain located in the northeast of Ali Sabieh Region in Djibouti. With an average elevation of 286 metres (938 ft) above sea level, they are situated near the border with Somalia.

References

Mountains of Djibouti